The Other Side is the second studio album by Australian rock band Tonight Alive.

Background and
On 12 March 2013 the group released as a music video for "Breakdown", a track that features Benji Madden of Good Charlotte. In March and April 2013, the group supported The Story So Far and Man Overboard on their co-headlining US tour, dubbed The Suppy Nation Tour. Sessions were held at Sapphire Beach Acreage in Coffs Harbour, New South Wales, Australia, with producer and engineer Dave Petrovic. Dan Korneff mixed the recordings at Sonic Debris Recording Studio in New York City, United States; Brad Blackwood mastered the album at Euphonic Masters.

Composition
Vocalist Jenna McDougall spoke to Alternative Press about the record:

"There are definitely some sad songs on the album, and I think there are a few heartbreakers, but there are also songs like 'The Fire' that's a super-liberating, empowering punk song. I'm so proud of that song because the lyrics are really passionate, affirmative and positive, but the music is really aggressive. [...]
"We are quite, not a bipolar band, but I think this album is really about finding our sound but at the same time also accepting that we don't have one particular sound. Not all our songs are going to be the same, and you can't put them under the same umbrella. Some of them are poppy, some of them are really heavy and some of them are somewhere in the middle. We found a balance on this record, and I'm proud of that because I think it's just being true as human beings. You can be at both ends of the scale."

McDougall explained that there is "a lot more cohesive [because] I know my voice a lot better. I'm excited because the songs have got a very pop structure but [they've] still got a lot of edge." The title track was originally three verses longer but the band edited the track down. This original version was more country-orientated and was inspired by "Your Guardian Angel" by the Red Jumpsuit Apparatus. It was edited down as the band expected the song to be released as a single and work "better as a radio song", according to McDougall. She found the decision "hard for me" as the song was personal to her. The chorus was completely rewritten a moment before McDougall was going to record her vocals for the song. It "tells the story of going from being friends to falling in love, and then the complications that followed before becoming just friends again."

Release
Following a BBC Radio 1 premier, a lyric video was released for "The Ocean" on 12 June. On 20 July it was announced that The Other Side would be released in September. On 31 July 2013, the band revealed the track listing on their Facebook page. "The Ocean" was released as the album's first single to digital outlets and YouTube preceding the album. "Lonely Girl" was later made as an instant download for those pre-ordering the album through iTunes. Preceded by a teaser trailer, a music video was released for "Lonely Girl" on 15 August. On 31 August "Hell and Back" was made available for streaming. The Other Side was released through Sony Music Australia on 6 September and made available for streaming the following day. The album was released in Europe and the UK on 9 September and 10 September in the US through Fearless Records as well as Japan on 11 September. Following this, the band embarked on a headlining Australian tour with support from Hands Like Houses and D at Sea. They then went on a European tour with Set It Off and Decade.

On 25 September a music video was released for "Come Home". The band then supported You Me at Six on their US tour in October, before embarking on their own headlining US tour, dubbed The Other Side Tour, until November. They were supported by The Downtown Fiction, For the Foxes and Echosmith. The band then performed as part of Warped Tour Australia in November and December. In early March 2014, the band released a music video for "The Ocean". In March and April, the group supported Taking Back Sunday and the Used on their co-headlining US tour. In August, the group appeared at the Reading and Leeds Festivals in the UK. In September, the group went on a co-headlining Australian tour with You Me at Six. They were supported by Call the Shots, With Confidence, Masketta Fall and Day Break. In October and November, the band supported Mayday Parade in ontheir headlining US tour, titled the Honeymoon Tour. Following this, the group went on a UK tour. During one of the shows, the band performed The Other Side in its entirety. In February and March 2015, the band performed at Soundwave festival in Australia.

Critical reception

The Other Side debuted at No. 5 on the Australian ARIA albums chart, No. 43 on the US Billboard 200 and No. 59 in the UK. It received positive reviews from critics, with praise for the album's direction and musicianship.

The Other Side received very positive reviews upon its release. Rob Foster of Kill Your Stereo reviewed the album positively: "The Other Side isn't just a step in the right direction. No, it's miles further than that. This is certainly the most accomplished thing Tonight Alive have released in their career yet, and frankly, given the quality of their previous releases, that says a lot. Tonight Alive are an excellent representation of Australian music in the international market, and 'The Other Side' backs that up magnificently." The Other Side was nominated for Best Album at the Kerrang! Awards.

Track listing
All songs written by Jenna McDougall and Whakaio Taahi, except where noted.

Japanese bonus track 
13. "Breakdown (feat. Benji Madden)"

Personnel
Personnel per booklet.

Tonight Alive
 Jenna McDougall – lead vocals
 Whakaio Taahi – guitar, backing vocals, strings, keyboards
 Jake Hardy – guitar
 Cam Adler – bass guitar, backing vocals
 Matty Best – drums

Additional musicians
 Wayne Richmond – strings, keyboards, programming,

Production and design
 Dave Petrovic – producer, engineer
 Dan Korneff – mixing
 Brad Blackwood – mastering
 Tonight Alive – art direction
 Ryan Clark – design

References
 Citations

Sources

External links

The Other Side at YouTube (streamed copy where licensed)

Tonight Alive albums
2013 albums
Emo pop albums
Pop rock albums
Fearless Records albums